Mount Steele is the fifth-highest mountain in Canada and either the tenth- or eleventh-highest peak in North America. Its exact elevation is uncertain.

It was named after Sir Sam Steele, the North-West Mounted Police officer in charge of the force in the Yukon during the Klondike Gold Rush.

Elevation 
Mount Steele's exact elevation is uncertain. However, this height was never tied to the sea-level datum established by the U.S. Coast and Geodetic Survey. More recent Canadian topographical maps no longer show a spot height, and their contour lines indicate a summit elevation of 5,02020 metres (about 16,47060 ft). The older figure continues to be quoted by other sources.

First ascent in 1935 
Walter A. Wood led a team consisting of Foresta Wood (Walter's wife), Swiss guide Hans Fuhrer, Joseph W. Fobes, Harrison Wood and I. Pearce Hazard. The expedition approached the peak on the eastern side from Kluane Lake. Base camp was established at the foot of the Steele Glacier with horses carrying loads to Advance Base Camp (known as Camp 6) further along the glacier. ABC provided good views of the mountain and the team decided on the east ridge as their line of ascent.

After waiting for the weather to improve after heavy snowfalls, a four-man team consisting of Walter Wood, Harrison Wood, Fuhrer and Forbes left Camp 8 at the base of the ridge. Their plan to was to make a  push to the summit. After steady upwards progress, deteriorating weather forced them to return to Camp 8 where they waited out a five-day storm which dumped over a metre of fresh snow. They started out again on August 15 and the ascent was made easier this time by windblown and hard steep snow slopes rather than steep soft snow on their earlier attempt. At , a plateau of wretched snow forced the team to crawl on all fours. Walter Wood commented:

Alternating the lead every 100 paces, they made their way from the plateau to the top, finally reaching the summit at 2:30 pm. The team enjoyed a blissful thirty minutes of windless conditions on top before beginning their descent.

Avalanche and landslides 
On 22 July 2007 at approximately 13:25 Pacific Daylight Time, a massive avalanche took place on Mount Steele when a slab of ice with a volume of about  broke loose from its north face. The avalanche registered as a 2.1-magnitude seismic event.

It was immediately recognized as one of the largest landslides in Yukon Territory history, if not the largest, and is one of the largest in the recorded history of western Canada.

It was one of the ten largest landslides of the year worldwide.

See also

List of mountain peaks of North America
Mountain peaks of Canada

References

External links

Five-thousanders of Yukon
Saint Elias Mountains